Philip P. Pan (born 20th century) is an American journalist, author, and International Editor at The New York Times. He previously worked as bureau chief in Moscow and Beijing for The Washington Post.

Early life 
Pan was born and raised in New Jersey. He is the son of immigrants from Taiwan.

Career
He won the Arthur Ross Book Award Gold Medal in 2009 for his bestselling book about political change in modern China, Out of Mao's Shadow: The Struggle for the Soul of a New China, which was also named a Best Book of 2008 by The Washington Post and The Economist.  The New York Times literary critic Michiko Kakutani wrote that the book possessed "both the immediacy of first-rate reportage and the emotional depth of field of a novel".

Pan was formerly a reporter for The Washington Post and headed its Beijing and Moscow bureaus.  He also received the 2002 Livingston Award for International Reporting for his articles about labor conditions in China, and an Overseas Press Club award and the Osborn Elliott Prize for Excellence in Journalism on Asia for stories about Chinese-style authoritarianism.  He started his career working at the Post's Metro Desk "covering crime, education and immigration policy" after graduating from Harvard University with a bachelor's in government in 1995.  He was managing editor for The Harvard Crimson and freelanced for The Boston Globe, and interned with the Los Angeles Times, Atlanta Journal-Constitution and The Jersey Journal. He joined The The Washington Posts Beijing bureau in 2000.

Pan's book profiles a dozen individuals caught in the struggle over China's political future, including a filmmaker trying to uncover the truth about the execution of a young woman named Lin Zhao during the Cultural Revolution, an elderly surgeon named Jiang Yanyong who blew the whistle on China's cover-up of the epidemic of severe acute respiratory syndrome, and a blind rural activist named Chen Guangcheng who was jailed after trying to stop a campaign of forced abortion and sterilization in his village.  Other topics covered by his book include China's shourong detention system, investigative journalism in China, and the publication and reception of An Investigation of China's Peasantry, by Chen Guidi and Wu Chuntao, which was later released as Will the Boat Sink the Water (2006) in its English translation.

After leaving The Post, Pan joined The New York Times as Beijing bureau chief and assistant foreign editor in 2011 He helped launch the newspaper's Chinese-language website, its first online edition in a foreign language. On September 22, 2022, The New York Times announced Pan as its International Editor.

Personal life
Pan is a graduate of Harvard University. He lives in Hong Kong with his wife and children.

See also

 List of American print journalists
 List of Harvard University people
 List of non-fiction writers
 Lists of American writers

References

External links
 

20th-century births
20th-century American non-fiction writers
21st-century American non-fiction writers
American political journalists
American expatriates in Hong Kong
American expatriates in Russia
The Harvard Crimson people
Living people
People's Republic of China historians
The Washington Post journalists
Journalists from Washington, D.C.
Year of birth missing (living people)
Livingston Award winners for International Reporting